Lawrence Chaziya (born 19 August 1998) is a Malawian professional footballer who plays as a centre-back and most recently played for the Jordanian club Al-Hussein.

Club career
Chaziya played for local club CIVO United until 2022. He then joined Al-Hussein of the Jordanian Pro League, signing a contract until the end of the 2022 season.

International career
He made his international debut with the Malawi national team in a 2–1 friendly win over Comoros on 31 December 2021. He was part of the Malawi squad the 2021 Africa Cup of Nations.

References

External links
 
 

1998 births
Living people
Malawian footballers
Malawi international footballers
Association football defenders
2021 Africa Cup of Nations players